The 2022 Skate Canada International was the second event in the 2022–23 ISU Grand Prix of Figure Skating, a senior-level international invitational competition series. It was held at the Paramount Fine Foods Centre in Mississauga, Ontario on October 28–30. Medals were awarded in the disciplines of men's singles, women's singles, pairs, and ice dance. Skaters earned points toward qualifying for the 2022–23 Grand Prix Final.

Entries 
The International Skating Union announced the preliminary assignments on July 22, 2022.

Changes to preliminary assignments

Results

Men

Women

Pairs

Ice dance

References

External links 
 

2021 Skate Canada International
2022 in figure skating
2022 in Canadian sports
October 2022 sports events in Canada